"San Frandisco" is a song by Australian house music producer Dom Dolla, released on 20 September 2019 as a stand-alone single.

"San Frandisco" was the recipient of multiple awards, including 
Best Independent Dance, Electronica or Club Single at the 2020 AIR Awards and Best Dance Release at the 2020 ARIA Music Awards (marking the second time Dolla had received a nomination for the award, following "Take It" in 2019), and was certified gold in Australia in 2020.

The song was nominated for Most Performed Dance Work at the APRA Music Awards of 2021

Background
Discussing the track, Dolla said: "San Francisco is where a lot of successful house music producers come from. Every time I went to San Fran, the audience and I seemed to gel. They really connected with my music and the records I was writing, and as I was leaving the club one night, I felt like writing a song to San Francisco."

Critical reception
Daniela Koulikov from Forte Magazine said "It's colourful, vibrant and addictive: equipped with blazing sirens, a deep bassline, and constant beats – perfectly for capturing the community of San Fran whilst also keeping the crowd dancing."

Track listings
Digital download
 "San Frandisco" – 3:05
 "Take It" – 3:54

Vinyl remixes (SWEATSV008)
 Side A
 "San Frandisco" (Extended Mix)	
 "San Frandisco" (Walker & Royce Remix)
 Side B
 "San Frandisco" (Eli Brown Remix)	
 "San Frandisco" (Illyus & Barrientos Remix)

Awards and nominations
AIR Awards

! 
|-
! scope="row" rowspan="2"| 2020
| "San Francdisco"
| Best Independent Dance, Electronica or Club Single
| 
| 
|}

ARIA Music Awards

! 
|-
! scope="row"| 2020
| "San Francdisco"
| Best Dance Release
| 
| 
|}

Charts

Certifications

See also
 List of number-one club tracks of 2019 (Australia)

References

2019 singles
2019 songs
Dom Dolla songs
ARIA Award-winning songs
Song recordings produced by Dom Dolla
Songs written by Dom Dolla